The following is a summary of Down county football team's 2021 season, which was its 118th year. The season was suspended until May 2021 due to the impact of the COVID-19 pandemic on Gaelic games.

Kits

Competitions

Dr McKenna Cup
There was no McKenna Cup in 2021 due to the impact of the COVID-19 pandemic on Gaelic games.

National Football League Division 2 North

Down were promoted to Division 2 following their 2020 campaign, however in December 2020, it was announced that each division would be divided into North and South sections in order to reduce fixtures and minimise cross-border matches. Teams will play three league games, plus possibly two knockout matches, allowing the tournament to be finished in just five rounds of games. In February 2021, it was announced that the league would be delayed due to the impact of the COVID-19 pandemic on Gaelic games, but that cancelling it would be a last resort.

The National League began on 15 May 2021. Following two defeats Down entered into the relegation play-offs, beating Laois 2-19 - 2-12 to retain their Division 2 status for the 2022 campaign.

Table

Fixtures

Ulster Senior Football Championship

The draw for the 2021 Ulster Championship was made on 22 April 2021.

Fixtures

Bracket

All-Ireland Senior Football Championship

Down could only enter the All-Ireland Senior Football Championship if they won the Ulster Championship. Following a defeat to Donegal, Down did not enter the 2021 All-Ireland Championship.

References

Down
Gaelic
Down county football team seasons